Thyrsacanthus is a genus of flowering plants in the family Acanthaceae, found in South America east of the Andes, typically in drier areas. Perennial shrubs, they were resurrected from Anisacanthus in 2010, leaving it with the North American species.

Species
Currently accepted species include:

Thyrsacanthus boliviensis (Nees) A.L.A.Côrtes & Rapini
Thyrsacanthus microphyllus A.L.A.Côrtes & Rapini
Thyrsacanthus ramosissimus Moric.
Thyrsacanthus ramosus (Nees) A.L.A.Côrtes & Rapini
Thyrsacanthus secundus (Leonard) A.L.A.Côrtes & Rapini

References

Acanthaceae
Acanthaceae genera